Armed Love is a studio album by The (International) Noise Conspiracy. Released on July 12, 2004, it is the first of two recording collaborations with producer Rick Rubin.

Track listing

"Black Mask" is different from the composition featured on The First Conspiracy.

The North American release included two other tracks, "A Voice of Our Own," and "Guns for Everyone", in addition to a different running order of the other tracks.

References

2004 albums
Albums produced by Rick Rubin
The (International) Noise Conspiracy albums
Burning Heart Records albums